Károly Knezić (6 September 1808, Veliki Grđevac - 6 October 1849, Arad) was a honvéd general in the Hungarian Army. On his father's side he had Croatian roots, while his mother was a Hungarian. He was executed for his part in the Hungarian Revolution of 1848, and is considered one of the 13 Martyrs of Arad.

Family
His father was of Croatian descent but in service to the Austrian border guard as an officer near Knezic. His mother, Borbála Benkő, was of Hungarian-Serbian descent, related to Mihajlo Latas, a Serb military officer in the Austrian Empire who later escaped and became known as the Turkish general Omar Pasha.

Life
He graduated from a military academy and had a quiet early career. Sometime around 1842 he was engaged to Katalin Kapitány (†1853), the daughter of the senator of Eger, Mihály Kapitány. They were married in June 1844 in the Cathedral of Eger - this time Knezić was a commanding captain. They had two daughters:
Irén (Eger, July 1847 - Eger, August 1882), married to Sándor Gröber 
Olga (Eger, July 1845 - Miskolc, May 1898), married to József Gröber

Military career
After the Revolution of March 1848, he volunteered his service in the Hungarian army. He first commanded a battalion of miners in the campaign against the Slovak national movement. He next participated in the campaign against the Serbs and in February 1849 campaigned in the region of Törökszentmiklós.

At the battle of Tápióbicske Tápió he occupied and held onto a bridge of strategic importance, and again distinguished himself in the trenches at the Battle of Komárom. He also participated in the Battle of Isaszeg and also the Battle of Nagysalló.

Due to his military success and distinction he quickly rose through the ranks and was promoted to major general after János Damjanich suffered a leg fracture and had to relinquish command as the third Corps Commander, and after this appointment took part in an important siege.

After the battle of Pered, when Artúr Görgei was removed from command and Lajos Kossuth was appointed corps commander of the Upper Tisza army, Knezić then served in the Ministry of Defence. Kossuth gave Knezić a post as governor of Transylvania, but the deterioration of the military situation led to a rather rapid collapse of leadership.

Death

After the army laid down their weapons and surrendered to the Russians, he, along with the other prisoners, was handed over to the Austrian military and entered the Arad prison. His wife initially attended to him diligently, but with the harvest approaching, Knezićné ordered her in September to return home. She said goodbye to her husband and left him there.

The Austrians held a court martial for all the leaders of the Hungarian army. He was sentenced to death by hanging, and was eighth in the line to be executed (fourth among those executed by hanging).

His bones were uncovered in 1932 during the flood of Arad. His body currently rests in the Arad cemetery crypt.

References

1808 births
1849 deaths
People from Veliki Grđevac
19th-century Croatian people
Hungarian people of Croatian descent
Hungarian people of Serbian descent
Executed Hungarian people
Executed Croatian people
19th-century Croatian military personnel
The 13 Martyrs of Arad